Lew Wallace is a statue by Andrew O'Connor that has been produced in both marble and bronze versions.

The marble version, a gift from the State of Indiana, was unveiled in the National Statuary Hall Collection in the Capitol in Washington, D.C. on January 11, 1910, in a commission that O'Connor received through the intervention of architect Cass Gilbert, with whom O’Connor had previously worked,  The same year a bronze version of the work was dedicated in Wallace's home town of Crawfordsville, Indiana at what was to become the General Lew Wallace Study and Museum.

See also
 Lew Wallace

References

External links
  

1910 establishments in Washington, D.C.
1910 sculptures
Bronze sculptures in Indiana
Lew Wallace
Marble sculptures in Washington, D.C.
Monuments and memorials in Indiana
Monuments and memorials in Washington, D.C.
Wallace, Lew
Sculptures of men in Indiana
Sculptures of men in Washington, D.C.
Statues in Indiana
Wallace